Hysni Milloshi (26 January 1946 – 25 April 2012) was the founder and General Secretary of the Communist Party of Albania, successor to the Party of Labor of Albania.

Biography

Milloshi was born in Macukull, Mat District, Albania, on January 26, 1946. During communist rule, Milloshi, who was a member of the Party of Labour, was a writer and a somewhat obscure figure. He established the "Enver Hoxha" Voluntary Activists' Union, an organization loyal to the principles and policies of Enver Hoxha, at Berat on 22 February 1991, apparently with the backing of some leading hard-liners in the Party of Labour. The organization waged a prominent and vocal struggle to prevent the unraveling of communist rule. Milloshi was also a modest author and poet.He died in Tirana's "Senatorium" hospital, on April 25, 2012, after struggling with pulmonary fibrosis.

Elections

Milloshi participated more than once in the local elections, running for Mayor of Tirana Municipality. He was considered a key factor in 2011 Pyrrhic victory of Lulzim Basha over former Mayor Edi Rama in Albanian Local Elections 2011, gaining around 1400 votes.

References

External links
 https://web.archive.org/web/20090530020808/http://www.cec.org.al/2004/Zgjedhejekuvendfiles/partite%20e%20regjistruara/partit2005.pdf (PDF)

Albanian politicians
Albanian communists
Stalinism
Anti-revisionists
Hoxhaists
2012 deaths
1946 births
Deaths from pulmonary fibrosis
People from Mat (municipality)